Finke, an interim Australian bioregion, comprises , and is part of two state/territories of Australia: the Northern Territory and South Australia. It is part of the Central Ranges xeric scrub ecoregion.

The bioregion has the code FIN.

Subregions
There are four subregions.

See also

Geography of Australia
Channel Country

References

Further reading
 Thackway, R and I D Cresswell (1995) An interim biogeographic regionalisation for Australia : a framework for setting priorities in the National Reserves System Cooperative Program Version 4.0 Canberra : Australian Nature Conservation Agency, Reserve Systems Unit, 1995. 

Biogeography of the Northern Territory
Biogeography of South Australia
IBRA regions